Acontia thapsina is a moth of the family Noctuidae. It is found in Queensland.

The wingspan is about 20 mm. Adults have yellow forewings, with variable dark brown markings, sometimes nearly covering the wings. The hindwings are brown, fading at the base.

External links
Australian Faunal Directory
Australian Insects

Moths of Australia
thapsina
Moths of Queensland
Moths described in 1902